Oleksandr Bondar,  (born 24 September 1981 in Zdolbuniv), is a Ukrainian futsal player who plays for Rekord Bielsko-Biała and the Ukraine national futsal team.

References

External links

Futsal-polska profile

1981 births
Living people
Ukrainian men's futsal players
Ukrainian expatriate sportspeople in Poland
People from Zdolbuniv
Sportspeople from Rivne Oblast